Miss International Ghana whose related to Miss Tourism Ghana is a national pageant that sends representatives to the Miss International beauty pageant. This pageant is unrelated to Miss Universe Ghana, Miss Ghana or Miss Earth Ghana pageant.

Franchise holder
Miss Tourism Ghana since 2016 was mandated by Miss International Foundation or ICA (International Cultural Association) as "The Franchise holder of Miss International for Ghana". The one of title holders of Miss Tourism Ghana will represent Ghana at the Miss International competition in Japan.

Titleholders 
Boldface indicates winner of the Miss International
Color key

References

External links
 www.facebook.com/MissTourismGH/

Ghana
Beauty pageants in Ghana
Recurring events established in 2016
Ghanaian awards